The Orpheum Theatre is a music venue located at 1 Hamilton Place in Boston, Massachusetts. One of the oldest theaters in the United States, it was built in 1852 and was originally known as the Boston Music Hall, the original home of the Boston Symphony Orchestra. The concert hall was converted for use as a vaudeville theater in 1900. It was renamed the Orpheum Theatre in 1906. In 1915, the Orpheum was acquired by Loew's Theatres and substantially rebuilt. It operates as a mixed-use hall, primarily for live music concerts.

The theater has no connection with Boston's Music Hall, currently known as the Wang Theatre.

History
When the Boston Symphony moved to Symphony Hall in 1900, the Boston Music Hall closed. It was converted, for use as a vaudeville theater in 1900 and operated under a number of different names, including the Music Hall and the Empire Theatre. In 1906, it was renamed the Orpheum Theatre. In 1915, the theater was acquired by the Loew's Theatres. Loew's reopened the Orpheum in 1916 with a completely new interior designed by architect Thomas W. Lamb.

Operated by Loew's, the theater was at first a combination vaudeville and movie theater and later a straight first-run movie house. The Orpheum closed as a movie theatre on January 31, 1971 and reopened as the Aquarius, a live concert hall, on May 27, 1971. The first featured performer was James Brown. The new owner was an African-American business owner and activist named Arthur Scott.

From 1975 to 1979, the Orpheum served as the home of the Opera Company of Boston, under director Sarah Caldwell, until that company moved to the current Boston Opera House.

The first half of The Police's 1995 double album Live! was recorded at the Orpheum on November 27, 1979. U2's performance at the theater in 1983 was recorded and broadcast on The King Biscuit Flower Hour. In 1984, the original lineup of Aerosmith reformed with a performance at the Orpheum. Tin Machine recorded a portion of their live album, entitled Tin Machine Live: Oy Vey, Baby, at the theater on November 20, 1991. Portions of the  March 3–4, 1992 shows at the Orpheum by the Allman Brothers, were used on their 1992 live CD An Evening with the Allman Brothers Band: First Set and the cover photo was taken in front of the venue's marquee.

Currently, the theater is owned by The Druker Company, Ltd. The contract to operate the Orpheum was acquired by Don Law, a Boston concert promoter, from the Live Nation entertainment company, in 2009. Law announced a major renovation for the theater, after which it reopened in late 2009. Live Nation retains a stake in the operations of Law's company, Crossroads Presents.

The current entrance to the theater is the former alley entrance, replacing the original entrance on Washington Street, which was converted into retail space.

Image gallery

See also
 Boston Music Hall, predecessor to the Orpheum (1852–1900)
 House of Blues

External links

 Orpheum Theatre website
 Orpheum Theatre at Cinema Treasures
 "Orpheum Theater," BOS.1769, Massachusetts Cultural Resources Information System (MACRIS)

References

Commercial buildings completed in 1852
Concert halls in Massachusetts
Music venues in Boston
Theatres in Boston
Movie palaces
1852 establishments in Massachusetts
Financial District, Boston
Loew's Theatres buildings and structures
Thomas W. Lamb buildings